Annales pharmaceutiques françaises  is a French journal founded in  1943. It covers the fields of pharmacology and pharmacy. It was formed by merging the Journal de pharmacie et de chimie and the Bulletin des sciences pharmacologiques.

External links
 National Library Of Medicine

Publications established in 1943
Pharmacology journals
Bimonthly journals